The 1921 Spring Hill Badgers football team was an American football team that represented the Spring Hill College as an independent during the 1921 college football season. In its third season under head coach Moon Ducote, the team compiled a 4–4 record. Three of its losses coming against college football powerhouses, Alabama, Auburn, and LSU. Spring Hill held both Alabama and LSU to 7–7 ties in the first half of those games. The final game of the season was a 28–7 loss to Mississippi College, which was led by College Football Hall of Fame member Goat Hale.

Schedule

References

Spring Hill
Spring Hill Badgers football seasons
Spring Hill Badgers football